The Movimiento Nacionalista Tacuara (MNT, Tacuara Nationalist Movement) was an Argentine far right orthodox peronist and fascist movement from 1955 through the 1960s, and in the years (at least) 1960–66, as Neo Nazis, which later integrated Juan Perón's right-wing “Special Formations”. Linked to the more radical sectors of the Peronist movement, and directly inspired by Julio Meinvielle's Catholic pronouncements, Tacuara defended nationalist, Catholic, anti-liberal, anti-communist, antisemitic and anti-democratic ideas, and had as its first model the Spaniard Primo de Rivera's fascist Falange. Its main leaders were Alberto Ezcurra Medrano (pro-Nazi and an admirer of Hitler & Mussolini), José Luis "Joe" Baxter (of Irish descent), Oscar Denovi, and Eduardo Rosa. Various ideologically contradictory movements emerged from this group. After three important splits in the early 1960s, the police cracked down on most factions in March 1964. A year later, the entire MNT was outlawed by President Arturo Illia (UCR). Composed of young people from right-wing backgrounds, it has been called the "first urban guerrilla group in Argentina".

(A tacuara was a rudimentary lance used by gaucho militias (known in Argentina as Montoneras) during the Argentine war of independence. It consisted of a knife blade tied to a stalk of taquara cane.)

1957 creation and antecedents 
The MNT was officially established at the end of 1957. First under the name of Grupo Tacuara de la Juventud Nacionalista (Tacuara Group of Nationalist Youth). It was mostly formed by young offspring of Buenos Aires’ high and middle bourgeoisie (almost all males), who were active in the Unión de Estudiantes Nacionalistas Secundarios (UNES) students’ union and the Alianza de la Juventud Nacionalista (Alliance of Nationalist Youth). Although strongest in Buenos Aires, during its peak the group spread all over the country, especially in Rosario, Santa Fe and Tandil. They propagandized through both their own publications and various nationalist periodicals, one of which in fact bore the name Tacuara; but it had been founded back in 1945, during the military government headed by Edelmiro Farrell, by a group of students affiliated to the UNES. Argentina, an important economic power at the beginning of the 20th century, had been hit hard by the 1929 Great Depression. Furthermore—as in other parts of the world—it was affected by a wave of authoritarianism. Argentine nationalism was influenced by Fascism and Nazism. This influence was reinforced by the arrival of Nazi fugitives fleeing from Germany after 1945.

Ideology 
The MNT inherited from the UNES’ aesthetics, inspired by Nazi parades and rituals. They called each other “comrades”, instead of using their first names. They wore gray armbands with the insignia of the Knights of Malta. Consisting of youths educated in military high-schools and religious schools, the MNT took advantage of the conflict arising from the enactment of the law on secularization of schools a few years earlier. They advocated reestablishment of Catholic teaching, suppressed by Perón's government before his overthrow in 1955, and struggled against “Judaism” and the left-wing. They opposed what they named “liberal democracy” and admired Hitler and Mussolini. Inspired by Primo de Rivera, founder of the Spanish Falange, "Tacuara rejected elections and the parliamentary system, were strongly anti-Marxist, revindicated social justice, proclaimed the Fatherland's and the Catholic religion's superiority over any other and exalted violence as a form of permanent mobilization."

From Perón (1945) to Frondizi (1958) 
When Juan Perón acceded to the presidency for the first time in 1945, nationalists in Argentina debated on whether to support him or not. At first, most decided to join him. However, two events pushed them apart from him. First was a bombing which occurred during turmoil over the hemispheric political initiative, the Acta de Chapultépec (signed by Edelmiro Farrell, it would be approved in 1947). This was a plan aimed at Latin America's integration under the leadership of the United States. Within Argentina, this initiative was supported by both Perón's personal delegate, John William Cooke, and one of Perón's main opposition leaders, Arturo Frondizi of the Radical Civic Union (the future president of Argentina). Perón himself reportedly opposed to the Acta but was rumored to be considering acceding, under pressure from military and business interests.  Nationalists organized a protest against it, which ended with 200 being jailed. Agitation continued. On April 15, 1953, two bombs exploded in Plaza de Mayo, killing five. The second event which pushed various nationalists to oppose Perón was his suppression of mandatory Catholic education in 1954. Thus, the nationalists acclaimed Eduardo Lonardi's arrival by plane to the chanting of Cristo Vence (Christ Prevails), in the aftermath of Perón's ouster in September 1955. However, as early as 1956, the nationalists returned to opposing the government, upset by the assumption of control of the junta by General Aramburu, who was allied with the old Conservative establishment.

When democratically elected president Arturo Frondizi took office in 1958, he enforced a nonreligious education program, alongside his brother, Risieri Frondizi, rector of the University of Buenos Aires (UBA). This new attack against clericalism prompted a violent response from the Catholic nationalist sectors. Created the year before, the Tacuara movement took advantage of the weakening of the Peronism movement (Perón was living in exile in Spain under Franco) and became a major opposition force. It was at its strongest between 1960 and 1962, attracting many young people. These included José Luis "Joe" Baxter, a nationalist and anti-imperialist born to working class Irish immigrants, who became the future founder of the Guevarist guerrilla movement (the ERP) as well as Alberto Ignacio Ezcurra Uriburu, who had been expelled from the Jesuits and remained a staunch defender of the radical right ideology. Moisés Ikonicoff, a Jewish socialist who opposed Peronism in 1955, sometimes attended MNT meetings. Carlos Mugica, a young theology teacher, who broke with the group after coming to support Che Guevara, and finally turned toward Peronism (before being killed by the Triple A death squad in 1974). Three brothers surnamed Guevara Lynch, who were cousins of Che, also participated in the MNT.

1960s splits 
The MNT split into along ideological lines between 1960 and 1963. Many of the new members were attracted by Peronism, while some of the old leaders were starting a slow and progressive process of ideological transformation towards Peronism and the left-wing. The 1959 Cuban Revolution was a major change and an axis of division between political forces. Joe Baxter was fascinated by the Cuban experience and its stand against the US — which only became complete in 1961, when Fidel Castro announced his choice in favor of socialism. At that time, Alberto Ezcurra and his followers became serious opponents of the Cuban revolution. Furthermore, many activists struggled alongside the trade unions and associated themselves with the Peronist Youth (JP), which wasn't well viewed in all sectors of the MNT. Thus, in March 1960, the priest Meinvielle, opposed to the alliance with Peronism, accused the original core of Marxist deviations. Meinvielle then created the Guardia Restauradora Nacionalista (GRN) which imposed the membership requirements of European ancestry and a family history of at least six generations of residence in Argentina.

The next split, on June 9, 1961, was the Movimiento Nueva Argentina (MNA; New Argentina Movement), headed by Dardo Cabo, which strove for Perón's return from exile. The MNA was one of the first right-wing Peronist organizations. MNA was launched in commemoration of General Juan José Valle's Peronist uprising in 1956. It became the ancestor of all modern Catholic nationalist groups in Argentina. During the visit of former United States President Dwight Eisenhower to Argentina in February 1962, the MNT headed nationalist demonstrations against him, leading to the imprisonment of several of their leaders, among them José Luis "Joe" Baxter. Baxter also established Arab ties that year.

During the 1962 elections, the MNT presented candidates in Buenos Aires (city) and in Entre Ríos (province) through the Unión Cívica Nacionalista (Civic Nationalist Union). However, sectors headed by José Luis "Joe" Baxter and José Luis Nell decided to join the Peronist movement (Justicialist party) believing in its revolutionary capacities. With Perón in exile, the movement named after him attracted people of various ideologies from various backgrounds. This heterogeneity would end with his return, during the 1973 Ezeiza Massacre.

Described by Argentinian representative to the UN as Nazis, in response to Ahmad Shukeiri having saluted them on November 30, 1962 and calling for others to adopt its principles (Shukairi mentioned the New York Times article while omitting the Nazi nature in the headline of that very article.); at the time by ADL described as "neo-Nazi storm troop gang" and by others as Neo-Nazis, especially after notorious June 1962 attack on Graciela Sirota, tattooing on her breast a Nazi swastika, as revenge for bringing Adolf Eichmann to justice in Israel. Both the attack on Gabriela Sirota and the Shukeiri salute months later were marked as "the dark days of 1962".

In 1963, after the Aramburu decree which banned even the use of Perón's name, and the subsequent prohibition of Peronism because of its success in the previous elections, José Luis "Joe" Baxter and José Luis Nell created the Movimiento Nacionalista Revolucionario Tacuara (MNRT, Revolutionary Nationalist Tacuara Movement) which, without forsaking nationalism, purportedly broke with the Church, the right-wing, and antisemitism. Baxter/Nell's MNRT purportedly became progressively more left-wing and attracted by Marxism. Many leaders of the future Montoneros and ERP's would come from the MNRT. On the other hand, Ezcurra's MNT was expecting a military coup. His group progressively became more and more instrumentalized by the secret services in the framework of a strategy of tension which was to justify the repression of the left-wing.

Operations 
The MNT maintained contacts with the police as well as with some former Nazi bureaucrats exiled in Argentina, which helped them gain easy access to weapons, an advantage which put them apart from other political organizations. They were also engaged in racketeering, demanding a “revolutionary tax” from many Jewish shops in the Once (once means 'eleven') neighborhood of Buenos Aires, until the shops organized themselves to confront the MNT together. At first mainly engaged in street fights with other rival students’ organizations, in particular concerning the conflict between nonreligious and religious schooling, the MNT also engaged in antisemitic acts (such as vandalism in the Jewish cemetery of La Tablada in 1959, etc.). The MNT's antisemitism became even stronger after Adolf Eichmann's May 1960 kidnapping by Israel's intelligence agency, the Mossad, leading to a violent antisemitic campaign which lasted until 1964, when the MNT was almost completely dismantled. This led the Jewish association DAIA to pressure the government into taking actions against MNT.

The peak was reached on August 17, 1960, when MNT members from Sarmiento National High School attacked Jewish pupils and injured a 15-year-old, Edgardo Trilnik, during the celebrations in honor of José de San Martín, Argentina's national hero in the war of independence. From then on, the MNT perpetrated acts of intimidation against the Jewish community, including bombing synagogues and other Jewish institutions and defacing the buildings with antisemitic graffiti. Following Eichmann's execution in 1962, the MNT launched 30 antisemitic attacks. On June 21, 1962, they kidnapped a 19-year-old Jewish girl, Graciela Sirota, tortured her, and scarred her with Swastika signs. In retaliation against this odious act, which raised public outrage, the DAIA on June 28, 1962, stopped all the activities of Jewish trade, supported by students (many high schools went on strike) and various political organizations, trade unions and intellectuals. These violent actions finally led the government to issue decree 3134/63 which prohibited, in 1963, any MNT or GRN activity. However, the influence of the secret services effectively nullified this decree.

Some members of the MNRT became famous on August 29, 1963, by assaulting the Policlínico Bancario bank, stealing 14 million pesos (equivalent to 100,000 US dollars), a fortune at the time. Two employees were killed in the assault and three injured. This was the first armed political action carried on by an exclusively civil group in Argentina's history, making of the MNT-MNRT the "first urban guerrilla group in Argentina". However, the police finally tracked down the robbers and practically dismantled the MNRT. Most imprisoned activists were freed in May 1973, when center-left (and Peronist) president Héctor Cámpora issued a broad amnesty decree for all political prisoners.

The MNT was invited by the Peronist trade-unions to the CGT's assembly in Rosario in 1964 in order to counter the left-wing. However, in obscure circumstances, gunshots in a closed environment led to the death of two Tacuara activists and one Peronist Youth member. The Tacuaras then retaliated by murdering Raúl Alterman, a Jewish communist chosen only on the basis of his background. This assassination again raised national public outrage, and Joe Baxter, former Tacuara activist who had formed the MNRT, publicly denounced Ezcurra's Nazi ideology on a media show hosted by Bernardo Neustadt. Rodolfo Barra, Justice Minister of Carlos Menem, was forced to resign in 1996 on charges that he had participated to the assassination.

In 1964, the Arab League's Hussein Triki (who had been a Nazi collaborator) strengthened the Arab League neo-Nazi ties and with Tacuara. On April 27, 1964, Argentine Arab Youth Movement distributed leaflets inviting the public to a "big demonstration in support of the Arab League." And its Hussein Triki. At that meeting, slogans: "Long Live Hitler", "Nasser and Peron", "Jews to the Crematoria", and "Make Soap out of the Jews", were voiced by participants, identified by their uniforms, as well as by their Nazi salute, as members of Tacuara and Guardia Restauradora Nacionalista, neo-Nazi groups.

Decline 

After the 1963 Policlinico Bancario assault and the 1964 murder of Raúl Alterman, many MNTers were arrested or forced into hiding. Thus, in the same month, March 1964, the two rival branches of Tacuaras (MNRT and MNR), were disbanded. The group was officially outlawed in 1965 under president Arturo Illia (UCR). After having met Perón, fighting in Vietnam (against the US) and travelling to China, Joe Baxter, one of the founders of the MNT, turned toward the revolutionary left-wing and finally became one of the cofounders of the ERP, alongside Mario Roberto Santucho. Baxter died on 11 July 1973 in a plane crash in France.
José Luis Nell, another MNT leader, joined the left-wing guerrilla group, the -Montoneros. He became a paraplegic from injuries suffered during the 1973 Ezeiza massacre on the day of Perón's return from 20 years of exile, and committed suicide two years later.

On the other hand, Alberto Ezcurra Uriburu, who was one of the strongest proponent of antisemitism, became a priest at the end of 1964 and left the organization's direction in the hands of Patricio Collins. Ezcurra would later work for the secret services, and then for the Argentine Anticommunist Alliance (Triple A) death squad and, following the 1976 military coup, elite military secret service squad, Batallón de Inteligencia 601.

Dardo Cabo later joined the Vandorista trade-union. Alongside three activists, Dardo Cabo hijacked a plane belonging to Aerolíneas Argentinas in 1966 to bring it to the Falkland Islands, where he planted an Argentine flag. He was later killed in detention by the military dictatorship on January 6, 1977.

See also 
History of Argentina
Argentine Patriotic League, a nationalist Catholic group created in 1919
Dirty War
 Fatherland and Liberty, a similar Chilean group
1973 Ezeiza Massacre
Peronism
José López Rega, leader of the far-right wing of Peronism
Jordán Bruno Genta, far-right ideologue

Endnotes

Bibliography 
 Leonardo Senkman, El antisemitismo en la Argentina, 
 Silvina Heguy, Joe Baxter, 
 Daniel Gutman, Tacuara, Historia de la primera guerrilla urbana Argentina, Vergara,

External links 
Website on the Tacuaras  
A 43 años de la Operación Rosaura: “El exilio de un muchacho peronista”, interview of Carlos Aberlos, former member of the MNRT who participated in the 1963 Policlínico Bancario assault before exiling himself to Spain, threatened by the Triple A 

Anti-communism in Argentina
Antisemitism in Argentina
Argentine nationalism
Catholic political parties
Defunct political parties in Argentina
Fascism in Argentina
Guerrilla movements in Latin America
Neo-fascist parties
Neo-fascist terrorism
Neo-Nazi organizations
Neo-Nazism in Argentina
Political parties established in 1957
1957 establishments in Argentina
Political parties disestablished in 1965
1965 disestablishments in Argentina
Paramilitary organisations based in Argentina
Falangist parties